Eliezer Zweifel (1815–1888) was a Russian-Jewish writer who was associated with the Jewish Enlightenment movement (haskalah). Zweifel's writings on Hasidic Judaism was considered favorable toward the movement. His book Shalom al Yisrael is believed to be one the earliest academic works on the Hasidic movement.

Biography 
Eliezer Zweifel was raised in the Mogilev region of White Russia. While in his twenties, Zweifel moved to Odessa, where for sixteen years he worked as a religious preacher and a tutor. From 1853 to 1873, Zweifel was appointed as a Talmud teacher at Beth Midrash L'Rabbanim in Zhitomir, an institution associated with the Jewish Enlightenment movement (haskalah). Zweifel's writings often contained anti-Haskalah statements, and drew criticism from other Haskalah authors including Mendele Mokher Sefarim. Zweifel authored a number of books and contributed dozens of essays to the Jewish periodicals of his time.

Books 
 Minnim V"ugav ("Psaltery and Harp" [Vilna, 1853])
 Tushiya (Zhitomir, 1867)
 Shalom 'Al Yisrael ("Peace upon Israel" [Zhitomir, 1868])—his magnum opus
 Heshbono Shel 'Olam ("An Accounting of the World" [Warsaw, 1878])
 Sanegor ("Defender" [Warsaw, 1885])—a defense of the Talmud

References 

1815 births
1888 deaths
Russian Jews
Jewish religious writers
19th-century male writers from the Russian Empire
19th-century non-fiction writers from the Russian Empire
Russian non-fiction writers
Male non-fiction writers
People of the Haskalah